Wall Springs Park is a  park located in Palm Harbor, Florida. The park includes a historical natural spring which was used as a bathing area from the turn of the 20th century until the 1960s. The park is located in Pinellas County, on the Florida Gulf Coast.

Amenities
From PinellasCounty.org

 Bike Racks
 Boardwalk, Nature Trail
 Educational and Informational Displays
 Fishing - Saltwater License
 Historic Interest
 Multi-purpose Trail
 Parking
 Pier
 A Covered, Barrier-Free Playground
 Restrooms
 Picnic Shelter & Grills
 Wildlife Observation Tower

Gallery

See also

List of major springs in Florida

References

Parks in Pinellas County, Florida
Southwest Florida Water Management District reserves
Springs of Florida
1988 establishments in Florida
Protected areas established in 1988